Sétif Province is a province (wilaya) in north-eastern Algeria. Its capital and largest city is Sétif; the next largest city is El Eulma. There is also the World Heritage Site of Djémila there.

History
In 1984 Bordj Bou Arréridj Province and Mila Province were carved out of its territory.

Administrative divisions
The province is divided into 20 districts (daïras), which are further divided into 60 communes or municipalities.

Districts

 Aïn Arnat
 Aïn Azel
 Aïn El Kébira
 Aïn Oulmane
 Amoucha
 Babor
 Béni Aziz
 Béni Ourtilane
 Bir El Arch
 Bouandas
 Bougaâ
 Djémila
 El Eulma
 Guenzet
 Guidjel
 Hammam Guergour
 Hammam Souhna
 Maoklane
 Salah Bey
 Sétif

Communes

 Aïn Abessa
 Aïn Arnat
 Aïn Azel
 Aïn El Kébira
 Aïn Azel
 Aïn Lahdjar
 Aïn Legraj
 Aïn Oulmane
 Aïn Roua
 Aïn Sebt
 Aït Naoual Mezada
 Aït Tizi
 Amoucha
 Babor
 Bazer Sakhra
 Beidha Bordj
 Belaa
 Béni Aziz
 Beni Chebana
 Beni Fouda
 Beni Hocine
 Béni Ourtilane
 Bir El Arch
 Bir Haddada
 Bouandas
 Bougaâ
 Bousselam
 Boutaleb
 Dehamcha
 Djémila
 Draa Kebila
 El Eulma
 El Ouldja
 El Ouricia
 Guellal
 Guelta Zerka
 Guenzet
 Guidjel
 Hamma
 Hammam Guergour
 Harbil
 Ksar El Abtal
 Maaouia
 Maoklane
 Mezloug
 Oued El Barad
 Ouled Addouane
 Ouled Sabor
 Ouled Si Ahmed
 Ouled Tebben
 Oum Ladjoul
 Rasfa
 Salah Bey
 Serdj El Ghoul
 Sétif
 Tachouda
 Talaifacene
 Tamazirt (city)
 Taya
 Tella
 Tizi N'Bechar

See also 

 South Righa - a historical region of Sétif Province

References

 
Provinces of Algeria
States and territories established in 1974